Alon Yefet (born September 1, 1972) is an international referee who was the first Israeli to officiate a UEFA Champions League match.

Yefet became a FIFA referee in 2001. He has served as a referee in qualifying matches for the 2006, 2010, and 2014 World Cups.

References

External links 
 
 

1972 births
Living people
Israeli Jews
Israeli football referees